Frederick W. Ford (September 17, 1909 – July 26, 1986) was born in Bluefield, West Virginia. He graduated from West Virginia University, where he studied law ("Frederick W. Ford" B6). A Republican, he was appointed to the Federal Communications Commission in 1957, and after the chairman, John C. Doerfer, was forced to resign after allegations of conflict of interest, President Dwight D. Eisenhower named him to take over as Chairman of the FCC.  Ford served in that role from March 15, 1960 to March 1, 1961.  During his time as the Chairman, he was praised for being a man of integrity.  One media critic called him "one of the most all-around competent commissioners ever to sit on the FCC" (Gould D25).

In late 1964, Ford suddenly left the FCC to become the president of a cable television trade association, the National Community Television Association, today known as the National Cable Television Association. In his new position as an advocate for the growing cable television industry, he was paid $50,000 a year (Kraslow 38).

Ford left the cable association in 1970, and returned to the practice of law.  He died on July 28, 1986 at the age of 76.

References
Frederick W. Ford's obituary at the New York Times
 "Ford Left FCC on Dec. 31, the White House Discloses."  New York Times, January 17, 1965, p. 38.
 "Frederick W. Ford, Sought Tight Rules as FCC Chairman."  New York Times, July 29, 1986, p. B6.
 Gould, Jack.  "Cable TV:  Where the Action Is."  New York Times, October 15, 1967, p. D25.
 Kraslow, David.  "Where is Mr. Ford of the FCC?"  Boston Globe, January 14, 1965, p. 38.

Specific

Chairmen of the Federal Communications Commission
1909 births
1986 deaths
Eisenhower administration personnel
Kennedy administration personnel